Chandranath Temple ( or Chandronath mondir), located on top of the Chandranath Hill, is a famous Shakti Peeth located near Sitakunda in Bangladesh where, as per Hindu sacred texts, the right arm of Goddess Sati fell. Chandranath Temple is a pilgrimage site for Hindus.

Historical references 
The Rajmala states that about 800 years ago, Raja Biswambhar Sur, a descendant of the famous Adisur of Gaur, tried to reach Chandranath by sea. The Nigamkalpataru refers to the  poet Jayadev living for a time in Chandranath. By the time of Dhanya Manikya, ruler of Tripura, Chandranath received numerous endowments. Dhanya Manikya attempted to remove the idol of Shiva from the temple to his kingdom but failed.

Legend
Sati was the first wife of Shiva as the first incarnation of Parvati. She was the daughter of King Daksha and Queen (the daughter of Brahma). She committed self-immolation at the sacrificial fire of a yagna performed by her father Daksha as she felt seriously distraught by her father's insult of her husband and her by not inviting them for the yagna. Shiva was so grieved after hearing of the death of his wife that he danced around the world in a Tandav Nritya (“devastating penance” or dance of destruction) carrying Sati's dead body over his shoulders.

Perturbed by this situation and to bring Shiv to a state of normalcy, Vishnu decided to use his Sudarshan Chakra (the rotating discus carried on his finger tip). He dismembered Sati's body with the chakra into 51 pieces and wherever her body fell on the earth, the place was consecrated as a divine shrine to Shakthi Peeth with deities of Sati (Parvati) and Shiva. These locations have become famous pilgrimage places as Pithas or Shakthi Pithas are found scattered all over the subcontinent including Pakistan, Bangladesh, Sri Lanka and Nepal, apart from India.

Sati is also known as Devi or Shakthi, and with blessings of Vishnu she was reborn as the daughter of Himavat or Himalayas and hence named as Parvati (daughter of mountains). She was born on the 14th day of the bright half of the month of Mrigashīrsha, which marks the Shivarathri (Shiva's night) festival.

The Chandranath Temple as a Shakti Peeth

The Chandranath Temple is considered as a Shakti Peetha, the revered shrines of Shaktism. The mythology of Daksha yaga and Sati's self immolation is the source mythology behind the origin of Shakti Peethas. Shakti Peethas are divine shrines of Shakti, due to the falling of body parts of the corpse of Sati Devi, when Lord Shiva carried it and wandered throughout Aryavartha in sorrow. There are 51 Shakti Peeth linking to the 51 alphabets in Sanskrit. Each temple have shrines for Shakti and  Kalabhairava. The Right Arm of Sati Devi's corpse is believed to have fallen here. The Shakti is known by the name Bhavani.

References

External links

Hindu temples in Chittagong Division
12th-century Hindu temples
Shakti Peethas
Tourist attractions in Chittagong
Hindu pilgrimage sites in Bangladesh